John Flaus (born 1934) is an Australian broadcaster and actor.

Filmography

Rake (2014)
Tracks (2013)
Jack Irish (2012-2021) - 3 films and 15 episodes as Wilbur
Pinion (2010)
I Love You Too (2010)
Mary and Max (2009)
Harvie Krumpet (2003)
Crackerjack (2002)
The Dish (2001) 
The Castle (1997) 
Lilian's Story (1996) 
The Nun and the Bandit (1992)
Bloodlust (1992)
See Jack Run (1992)
Spotswood (1992) 
In Too Deep (1990) 
Jigsaw (1990)
Nirvana Street Murder (1990)
Warm Nights on a Slow Moving Train (1989) 
Grievous Bodily Harm (1988)
Devil's Hill (telefilm) (1988)
Ghosts of the Civil Dead (1988)
Hungry Heart (1987) 
Feathers (1987)
Traps (1986)
My Country (1986)
Bootleg (1985)
Strikebound (1984)
The Plains of Heaven (1982)
Wronsky (1980)
Blood Money (1980) 
Palm Beach (1979) 
Newsfront (1978)
The Love Letters from Teralba Road (1977)
Queensland (1976)
Yackety Yack (1974)
The American Poet's Visit (1969)

Bibliography

 
 
 Sydney Libertarians and Anarchism Index

References

Australian anarchists
Australian male film actors
People from New South Wales
Australian film critics
1934 births
Living people